The Dazi Bridge is a one-lane suspension bridge in Dagzê, Tibet.

Structure
The bridge is a gravity-anchored suspension bridge with deck trussing.

See also
List of longest suspension bridge spans

References

External links
  A picture of the bridge at Tibet Highway
 

Suspension bridges in Tibet
Bridges completed in 1984